No More Women is a 1934 American pre-Code adventure film directed by Albert S. Rogell and starring  Edmund Lowe, Victor McLaglen, Sally Blane and Minna Gombell. The film was released and distributed by Paramount Pictures. It was part of a long-running series that paired Lowe and McLaglen as friendly rivals dating back to the 1926 silent film What Price Glory?

Synopsis
Two salvage divers are romantic rivals for the love of Annie Fay. They both agree to back off and swear that they will pursue "no more women". However soon afterwards one of their boats is inherited by the attractive Helen Young who takes up quarters aboard. This triggers a new rivalry between them, and leads briefly to one of them wrongly being suspected of the other's murder. They join forces to thwart an attempt to kill them by a greedy rival crew when they are diving to recover a cargo of gold bullion. Ultimately Helen picks neither of them, telling them they are like brothers to her and they again pledge to give up women.

Cast
Edmund Lowe as Three-Time
Victor McLaglen as Forty-Fathoms
Sally Blane as Helen Young
Minna Gombell as Annie Fay
Alphonse Ethier as Captain Brent
J. P. McGowan as Captain of The Hawk
Harold Huber as Iceberg
Tom Dugan as Greasy
Christian Rub as Big Pants
Frank Moran as Brownie
Billy Franey as Oscar
Thomas E. Jackson as Detective

References

External links
 

1934 films
1930s English-language films
1930s adventure comedy films
American adventure comedy films
1934 comedy films
1934 adventure films
Paramount Pictures films
Films directed by Albert S. Rogell
American black-and-white films
Seafaring films
1930s American films